Anastasiya Kunitskaya (born 22 January 1989) is a Belarusian women's football defender. She plays in the Turkish Women's First Football League for Horozkent Spor with jersey number 22.

Club career 
Kunitskaya played in her country for Bobruichanka Bobruisk between 2010 and 2015, capping in 96 matches in the Women's Premier League and scoring one goal. In that period, she appeared in 23 matches of the Women's Cup netting two goals,  in two matches of the Women's Super Cup and played three games in the Women's Championship. In 2016 and 2017, she was with  FC Energetik-BGU Minsk, where she scored one goal in 30 league matches. She took part in six games of the Women's Cup, in one match of the Women's Super Cup and three matches of the Women's Championships. She then returned to her home club in 
the 2018 league season. She scored one goal in 32 league matches, and played in five Women's Cup matches.

In the beginning of October 2019, she moved to Turkey to join the Istanbul-based top-level Turkish First League club Ataşehir Belediyespor. She left the team after capping in three matches.  For the 2021–22 Turkish Super League season, she signed with Hatayspor. In the beginning of the 2022–23 Turkish Super League season, she signed with the  Istanbul-based club Kireçburnu Spor. Mid January 2023 in the half of the season, she transferred to the newly-starting second-level Turkish First League club Horozkent Spor in Denizli.

International career
As a member of the Belarus women's national football team, Kunitskaya took part at three qualification matches of the UEFA Women's Euro 2017, and in one match of the UEFA Women's Euro 2021 qualification round.

References

External links 

1989 births
Living people
Belarusian women's footballers
Women's association football defenders
Belarus women's international footballers
Belarusian expatriate footballers
Belarusian expatriate sportspeople in Turkey
Expatriate women's footballers in Turkey
Ataşehir Belediyespor players
Bobruichanka Bobruisk players
Hatayspor (women's football) players
Kireçburnu Spor players